Sacred Concert by Duke Ellington is one of the following realisations:
 1965 - Concert of Sacred Music
 1968 - Second Sacred Concert
 1973 - Third Sacred Concert

Ellington called these concerts "the most important thing I have ever done".  He said many times that he was not trying to compose a "Mass" (liturgy). The critic Gary Giddins has characterized these concerts as Ellington bringing the Cotton Club revue to the church.

Concert of Sacred Music 

Grace Cathedral in San Francisco planned a "Festival of Grace", with a variety of cultural works and speakers, to occur during the first year the cathedral was open, and Ellington's concert was to be a part of it. (The "festival" also included a performance by Vince Guaraldi.)

The concert premiered on September 16, 1965, and was recorded by KQED, a local public television station.  The performance was released on CD as A Concert of Sacred Music Live from Grace Cathedral and on DVD as Love You Madly/A Concert of Sacred Music at Grace Cathedral. The official album on RCA, A Concert of Sacred Music, was recorded at two concerts at Fifth Avenue Presbyterian Church in New York on December 26, 1965.  Additional material from these concerts, not found on the original album, can be found on the 24-CD box set The Duke Ellington Centennial Edition: The Complete RCA Victor Recordings (1927-1973). The concert mixed existing and new material, with "New World A-Commin" and "Come Sunday" from Black Brown and Beige and "Heritage (My Mother, My Father)" from the show My People. A new piece, the song "In the Beginning God", was awarded a Grammy Award in 1967. It was performed again at Grace Cathedral on its 25th and 50th anniversaries, in 1990 and 2015.

Reception
The Allmusic review by Richard S. Ginell awarded the album five stars and stated "the concert taps into Ellington's roots in showbiz and African-American culture as well as his evidently deep religious faith, throwing it all together in the spirit of universality and sealing everything with the stamps of his musical signatures".

Ebony magazine called the piece "historic", situating it as part of a larger movement in the mid-60s that brought together jazz and religion.

Track listing
All compositions by Duke Ellington
 "In the Beginning God" - 19:36
 "Will You Be There?" - 1:23
 "Ninety Nine Percent" - 2:23
 "Ain't But the One" - 3:31
 "New World a'Coming" - 9:56
 "In the Beginning, God II" - 4:31
 "Heritage" - 3:42
 "The Lord's Prayer" - 3:16
 "Come Sunday" - 5:30
 "David Danced Before the Lord With All His Might" - 9:00
 "The Lord's Prayer II" - 4:56

The album was recorded at the Fifth Avenue Presbyterian Church on December 26, 1965.

Personnel
Duke Ellington – piano
Cat Anderson, Mercer Ellington, Herb Jones, Cootie Williams - trumpet
Lawrence Brown, Buster Cooper, Quentin Jackson - trombone
Chuck Connors - bass trombone
Russell Procope, Jimmy Hamilton - alto saxophone, clarinet
Johnny Hodges - alto saxophone
Paul Gonsalves - tenor saxophone
Harry Carney - baritone saxophone
John Lamb - bass
Louie Bellson - drums
Brock Peters, Queen Esther Marrow, Jimmy McPhail - vocals
The Herman McCoy Choir - choir
Bunny Briggs - tap dancing (track 10)

Second Sacred Concert 

Ellington's Second Sacred Concert premiered at the Cathedral of St. John the Divine in New York on January 19, 1968, but no recording of this actual performance has surfaced.  The Second Sacred Concert was then recorded on January 22 and February 19, 1968, at Fine Studio in New York and originally issued as a double LP on Prestige Records and reissued on one CD minus the tracks "Don't Get Down On Your Knees To Pray Until You Have Forgiven Everyone" and "Father Forgive". All the tracks can be found in the 24-CD box set The Duke Ellington Centennial Edition: The Complete RCA Victor Recordings (1927-1973).

This concert is the first time Swedish singer Alice Babs recorded with the Ellington Orchestra.  In the concert she sang "Heaven" and the wordless vocal, "T.G.T.T. (Too Good to Title)".  Cootie Williams has a "growl" trumpet feature on "The Shepherd (Who Watches Over the Night Flock)".  This piece is dedicated to Rev. John Garcia Gensel, Lutheran pastor to the jazz community.  The climactic ending is "Praise God and Dance", which comes from Psalm 150.

At the invitation of the Harvard Episcopal Chaplaincy, Ellington gave the concert again at Emmanuel Episcopal Church, Boston on April 20, 1969.

Reception
The Allmusic review by Richard S. Ginell awarded the album 4 stars and stated "the material is fresh, not a patchwork of old and new like the first concert — and in an attempt to be as ecumenical as possible, Ellington reaches for novel techniques and sounds beyond his usual big band spectrum".

Track listing
All compositions by Duke Ellington
 "Praise God" - 3:09
 "Supreme Being" - 11:45
 "Heaven" - 4:55
 "Something About Believing" - 8:12
 "Almighty God" - 6:32
 "The Shepherd (Who Watches over the Flock)" - 7:10
 "It's Freedom" - 13:00
 "Meditation" - 3:10
 "The Biggest and Busiest Intersection" - 3:57
 "T.G.T.T. (Too Good to Title)" - 2:25
 "Don't Get Down On Your Knees To Pray Until You Have Forgiven Everyone" -  5:13 Omitted from CD reissue
 "Father Forgive" - 2:49 Omitted from CD reissue
 "Praise God And Dance" - 10:49
Recorded at Fine Studio in New York on January 22 (tracks 3, 5, 7, 10 & 13) and February 19 (tracks 1, 2, 4, 6, 8, 9, 11 & 12), 1968.

Personnel
Duke Ellington – piano, narration
Cat Anderson, Mercer Ellington, Money Johnson, Herb Jones, Cootie Williams - trumpet
Lawrence Brown, Buster Cooper, Bennie Green - trombone
Chuck Connors - bass trombone
Russell Procope - alto saxophone, clarinet
Johnny Hodges - alto saxophone
Jimmy Hamilton - clarinet, tenor saxophone
Paul Gonsalves - tenor saxophone
Harry Carney - baritone saxophone
Jeff Castleman - bass
Sam Woodyard, Steve Little - drums
Alice Babs, Devonne Gardner, Trish Turner, Roscoe Gill - vocals
The AME Mother Zion Church Choir, Choirs Of St Hilda's and St. Hugh's School, Central Connecticut State College Singers, The Frank Parker Singers - choirs

Third Sacred Concert 

The Third Sacred Concert was built around the skills of Alice Babs, Harry Carney, and Ellington himself on the piano.  It was premiered at Westminster Abbey in London, United Kingdom on October 24, 1973, and released on LP in 1975 but has only been issued on CD as part of the 24-disc The Duke Ellington Centennial Edition: The Complete RCA Victor Recordings (1927-1973) collection.

At this point in his life, Ellington knew he was dying.  Author Janna Tull Steed has written that of all the concerts that Ellington is addressing God facing his mortality.  Alice Babs sings Is God a Three Letter Word for Love? and My Love. Tenor saxophonist Harold Ashby is featured on The Brotherhood, which is a tribute to The United Nations.

Reception
The Allmusic review by Richard S. Ginell awarded the album 3 stars and stated "the weakest of the sacred concerts. It lacks the showbiz kick and exuberance of the first concert and even more eclectic impulses of the second, now burdened with a subdued solemnity and the sense that the ailing Ellington knew his time was drawing to a close (he would be dead exactly six months later)".

Track listing
All compositions by Duke Ellington
 Introduction By Sir Colin Crowe - 1:28
 Duke Ellington's Introduction - 1:26
 "The Lord's Prayer: My Love" - 7:49
 "Is God A Three-Letter Word For Love? (Part I)" - 4:27
 "Is God A Three-Letter Word For Love? (Part II)" - 3:46
 "The Brotherhood" - 5:46
 "Hallelujah" - 3:32
 "Every Man Prays In His Own Language" - 11:10
 "Ain't Nobody Nowhere Nothin' Without God" - 4:20
 "The Majesty Of God" - 7:27
Recorded at Westminster Abbey, London on October 24, 1973.

Personnel
Duke Ellington – piano, narration
Johnny Coles, Mercer Ellington, Barrie Lee Hall, Money Johnson - trumpet
Art Baron, Vince Prudente - trombone
Chuck Connors - bass trombone
Harold Minerve - alto saxophone, flute
Russell Procope - alto saxophone
Harold Ashby - clarinet, tenor saxophone
Percy Marion - tenor saxophone
Harry Carney - baritone saxophone, clarinet, bass clarinet
Joe Benjamin - bass
Quentin Whit - drums
Alice Babs, Tony Watkins - vocals
John Alldis Choir - choir

Notes

References
Steed, Janna Tull Duke Ellington: A Spiritual Biography (Lives & Legacies) 

America Records albums
Sacred Concerts
1966 live albums
1968 albums
America Records live albums
1975 live albums
Duke Ellington albums
Live album series
Duke Ellington live albums